Franciscus Leonardus Antonius Johannes (Frans) Wolters (21 October 1943 in Venlo – 9 February 2005 in Venlo) was a Dutch politician. From 1981 to 1998 he was a member of the House of Representatives of the Netherlands for the Christian Democratic Appeal (CDA). He also was a member and an alderman of the municipal council of Venlo and mayor ad int. of Horst aan de Maas.

External links 
 Biography, Parlement.com

1943 births
2005 deaths
20th-century Dutch politicians
21st-century Dutch politicians
Aldermen in Limburg (Netherlands)
Christian Democratic Appeal politicians
Mayors in Limburg (Netherlands)
People from Horst aan de Maas
Members of the House of Representatives (Netherlands)
Municipal councillors in Limburg (Netherlands)
People from Venlo
Tilburg University alumni